Berberis tenuifolia is a shrub in the family Berberidaceae described as a species in 1838. It is native to Cuba and Mexico (States of Veracruz, Chiapas, and Oaxaca).

References

Flora of Mexico
Flora of Cuba
tenuifolia
Plants described in 1838
Flora without expected TNC conservation status